Ace Cider is a hard cider company based in Sebastopol, California, United States. It is privately owned operated by California Cider Company, Inc.

History
California Cider was founded by Jeffrey House and formally incorporated in July 1993. The company makes cider, an alcoholic beverage fermented from apples, and was one of the first cider companies formed in the US after the end of Prohibition.  ACE Cider also opened the first modern cider-centered pub in the US in 1999. While the pub closed in 2010, the company maintains a cider tasting room on its premises. Mr. House located his business in the Sonoma County historic apple growing region because it reminded him of his native England.

Location
ACE Cider has become a significant employer in the largely rural "West County" portion of Sonoma County. The company's existence and success (as demonstrated by rapid sales growth in the 3–5 years prior to 2013 in particular) bucks the trend of the "homogenization" of the county's agricultural economy, i.e. the domination of agriculture by the production of wine grapes.

See also
List of cider brands

References

External links

American ciders
Companies based in Sonoma County, California
Drink companies based in California
Privately held companies based in California